Bagheshlu (also Romanized as Bāgheshlū) is a village in Bastamlu Rural District, in the Central District of Khoda Afarin County, East Azerbaijan Province, Iran. At the 2006 census, its population was 25, in 6 families.

References 

Populated places in Khoda Afarin County